Manpur is a village in Chandankiyari CD Block of Bokaro district of the Indian State of Jharkhand, near the city of Bokaro.

References 

Villages in Bokaro district